Raiders of the South is a 1947 American Western film directed by Lambert Hillyer and written by J. Benton Cheney. The film stars Johnny Mack Brown, Evelyn Brent, Raymond Hatton, Reno Browne, Marshall Reed and John Hamilton. The film was released on January 18, 1947, by Monogram Pictures.

Plot

Cast          
Johnny Mack Brown as Captain Johnny Brownell
Evelyn Brent as Belle Chambers
Raymond Hatton as Shorty Kendall
Reno Browne as Lynne Chambers 
Marshall Reed as Larry Mason
John Hamilton as George Boone
John Merton as Preston Durant
Eddie Parker as Jeb Warren
Frank LaRue as Judge Fry
Ted Adams as Prosecuting Attorney
Pierce Lyden as Marshal Michael Farley
Cactus Mack as Pete

References

External links
 

1947 films
American Western (genre) films
1947 Western (genre) films
Monogram Pictures films
Films directed by Lambert Hillyer
American black-and-white films
1940s English-language films
1940s American films